Ciudad Jardín Bicentenario, also known as Ciudad Jardín, is a sports and shopping complex in Ciudad Nezahualcóyotl ("Neza"), State of Mexico, part of Greater Mexico City. Opened in May 2009, it was developed on 250 hectares of what were the Neza I y II landfills, which in their 65 years of history received over 12,000 tons of garbage from Mexico City. On 60 ha a sports center was built, the largest in Greater Mexico City. On the second lot a shopping center was built, inaugurated in late 2008, as well as a higher education institute, a hospital, medical offices, a community center and an entertainment area.

History

Development
In the early decade of the 2000s, ideas were raised as to how to transform one of the largest landfills in the Americas into a center for shopping, ecology, education, and living, in the way that had already been accomplished in Santa Fe, Mexico City. Municipal and state authorities as well as private investors supported the idea.

About 200 million dollars in private capital was invested, 70% of which was that of Promotora Sanborn's and Constructora IDEAL (Impulsora para el Desarrollo y el Empleo en América Latina), both companies headed up by billionaire Carlos Slim Helú.  Of the 200 million USD, about 400 million Mexican pesos went to build the sports complex.

Ciudad Jardín was opened by the State of Mexico governor (later Mexican president) Enrique Peña Nieto and by Slim on 22 May 2009.

Current
As of June 2013, it is reported that since 2009 the sports complex has been closed. The city of Neza is trying to gain control from the controlling Board of Trustees.

Name
The name celebrates the Mexican bicentennial in 2010, as the complex was expected to be complete by that year.

Shopping center
The shopping center areas have a total land area of 88 457 m² and a total 175 635 m² of built-up area.
It is divided into two sections, 'Plaza Ciudad Jardín" and "Centro Comercial Ciudad Jardín", where two retail groups predominate: Wal-Mart with a Wal-Mart and Sams Club, restaurants Vips and El Portón and department store Suburbia; while Grupo Carso has Sears, Mixup and Sanborns. There are 194 stores and parking for 3750 cars.

Ciudad Deportiva
The Sports Center covers 60 hectares and has 41 fields and courts: 25 soccer fields, five for indoor soccer, two American football fields, four tennis courts, four basketball courts, four volleyball courts, two jai alai courts, two baseball fields, an aerobics floor, playgrounds and recreational areas. It also contains a nearly Olympic-sized stadium, a cycling track and two gymnasiums. However, as of January 2010, it is closed to the public because state and municipal authorities have not regularized the title of the land on which it sits. Entrance to the facilities will be free, due to corporate sponsorship to cover administrative costs.

Other amenities
Universidad La Salle and Universidad Autónoma del Estado de México have a presence here as well as a Rehabilitation center for Teletón México. The center is planned to be connected to route 3 of the Ferrocarril Suburbano de la Zona Metropolitana del Valle de México (suburban rail system) a line that should connect metro station Metro Nezahualcoyotl with Chalco.

External links
Shopping center's Facebook page

References

Shopping malls in Greater Mexico City
Parks in Mexico
Sports venues in the State of Mexico
Ciudad Nezahualcóyotl
Former landfills